Auriglobus modestus, the bronze puffer or golden puffer, is a ray-finned fish in the family Tetraodontidae. It is found in the middle parts of rivers to their estuaries in southeast Asia, including Cambodia, Laos, Thailand, Vietnam, Malaysia and Indonesia.

References 

Tetraodontidae
Fish of Thailand
Taxa named by Pieter Bleeker
Fish described in 1850